HMS Valiant was a 74-gun third-rate ship of the line of the Royal Navy, launched on 24 January 1807 at Blackwall Yard.

She took part in the attack on Copenhagen in 1807 and in the action against French warships in the Basque Roads from 11–25 April 1809 (Battle of Aix Roads) under Lord Gambier and Lord Cochrane.

On 17 June 1813, Valiant was in company with  when they came upon HMS Wasp in pursuit of an American brig off Cape Sable. The three British ships continued the chase for another  before they finally were able to capture the brig. She was the letter of marque Porcupine, of more than 300 tons, and was carrying a valuable cargo of brandy, wine, silks, dry goods and other merchandise from Bayonne to Boston. Captain Robert Dudley Oliver of Valiant described Porcupine as being only eight months old and an uncommonly fast sailer. After the capture, Wasp, which had recaptured a prize that the privateer  had taken, sailed in search of the privateer.

She was broken up in 1823.

Notes

References

 Lavery, Brian (2003) The Ship of the Line - Volume 1: The development of the battlefleet 1650-1850. Conway Maritime Press. .

External links
 
 Log Book of Proceedings on board His Majesty's Ship Valiant, 1811-1813, MS 156 held by Special Collections & Archives, Nimitz Library at the United States Naval Academy

Ships of the line of the Royal Navy
Repulse-class ships of the line
1807 ships
War of 1812 ships of the United Kingdom